William Giles Bosisto (born 8 September 1993) is an Australian cricketer who was contracted to South Australia at domestic level. Bosisto represented Western Australia at under-17 and under-19 level, and debuted for the state's under-23 side in the Futures League in November 2011, at the age of 18. At the 2011–12 Australian Under-19 Championships, he captained Western Australia, and was subsequently selected to captain the Australian under-19 cricket team at the 2012 ICC Under-19 Cricket World Cup. At the competition's conclusion, Bosisto was named "Man of the Tournament", having led the overall batting averages with 276 runs from six matches.

Bosisto had been granted a rookie contract with the Western Australian Cricket Association (WACA) for the upcoming 2012–13 season prior to competing in the World Cup. He made his List A debut for the state in the 2012–13 Ryobi One-Day Cup, replacing the injured Adam Voges. In the match against Victoria at the WACA Ground, Bosisto was run out for a duck after facing five balls in Western Australia's innings, having come in at number six in the batting order. Bosisto's first-class debut came the following season, in the 2013–14 edition of the Sheffield Shield. He scored 44 runs in the second innings of his debut match, which included a 124-run partnership with Marcus North (118 not out) for the third wicket. At grade cricket level, Bosisto plays for the Claremont-Nedlands Cricket Club, having made his first grade debut during the 2010–11 season. Outside of cricket, he attended Scotch College at secondary level, and is currently studying a commerce degree at the University of Western Australia.

He made his Twenty20 debut for Perth Scorchers in the 2017–18 Big Bash League season on 23 December 2017. In April 2021, Bosisto was one of five players to be dropped by the South Australia cricket team, following a season without any wins.

References

1993 births
Australian cricketers
Cricketers from Western Australia
Living people
People educated at Scotch College, Perth
Sportspeople from Geraldton
Western Australia cricketers
Cricket Australia XI cricketers
Perth Scorchers cricketers
South Australia cricketers